HDL simulators are software packages that simulate expressions written in one of the hardware description languages, such as VHDL, Verilog, SystemVerilog.

This page is intended to list current and historical HDL simulators, accelerators, emulators, etc.

Proprietary simulators 

Some commercial proprietary simulators (such as ModelSim) are available in student, or evaluation/demo editions. These editions generally have many features disabled, arbitrary limits on simulation design size, but are sometimes offered free of charge.

Free and open-source simulators

Verilog simulators

VHDL simulators

Key

See also
 Verilog
 SystemVerilog
 VHDL
 SystemC
 Waveform viewer

References

Hardware description languages
Electronic design automation software
Electronic circuit verification
HDL simulators